Sebastian Michał Chmara (born 21 November 1971) is a former decathlete from Poland who became world indoor champion in 1999 and European indoor champion in 1998 (both in heptathlon, as decathlon is unsuitable for indoor contests).

His personal bests are 8566 points in the decathlon (Alhama de Murcia 1998) and 6415 points in the indoor heptathlon (Valencia 1998). Both are standing national records.

He is a cousin of a former pole vaulter, Mirosław Chmara.

Competition record

Personal bests

Outdoor
100 metres – 11.04 (+1.8 m/s) (1998)
400 metres – 47.76 (1998)
1500 metres – 4:26.96 (1996)
110 metres hurdles – 14.25 (+1.5 m/s) (1998)
High jump – 2.14 (2001)
Pole vault – 5.20 (1997)
Long jump – 7.75 (1996)
Shot put – 16.03 (1998)
Discus throw – 43.48 (1997)
Javelin throw – 58.02 (2000)
Decathlon – 8566 (1998) NR
Indoor
60 metres – 7.09 (1998)
1000 metres – 2:37.86 (1999)
60 metres hurdles – 7.92 (1998)
High jump – 2.17 (1998)
Pole vault – 5.30 (1999)
Long jump – 7.65 (1998)
Shot put – 15.89 (1999)
Heptathlon – 6415 (1998) NR

See also
Polish records in athletics

References

External links
 
 All-Athletics profile

1971 births
Living people
Polish decathletes
Athletes (track and field) at the 1996 Summer Olympics
Olympic athletes of Poland
Sportspeople from Bydgoszcz
Universiade medalists in athletics (track and field)
Kazimierz Wielki University in Bydgoszcz alumni
Zawisza Bydgoszcz athletes
Universiade silver medalists for Poland
World Athletics Indoor Championships winners
Medalists at the 1995 Summer Universiade